The Statue of Dame Whina Cooper is located in Panguru, New Zealand, and honours the life of Dame Whina Cooper, a Māori leader and land rights activist.

The statue was commissioned by the New Zealand Government and was created by Jimi Hills, of Ngāti Porou, Tūhoe and Te Whānau a Upokorehe. It is based on a well-known photograph by Michael Tubberty showing Dame Whina holding the hand of her three-year-old granddaughter Irenee Cooper as the pair left the settlement of Te Hāpua at the start of the 1100-kilometre 1975 Māori land march.

The statue is located in front of Waipuna Marae in the small north Hokianga settlement of Panguru. It was unveiled on 2 February 2020 by Dame Whina's son Joe Cooper and Prime Minister Jacinda Ardern.

References

Monuments and memorials to women
2020 sculptures
Cooper, Whina
Outdoor sculptures in New Zealand
Statues of activists
Bronze sculptures in New Zealand
Cultural depictions of New Zealand women
Statues in New Zealand
Hokianga